Voyvyl (Voľvyl) is a rural locality (a village) in Kosinskoye Rural Settlement, Kosinsky District, Perm Krai, Russia. The population was 47 as of 2010. There are 3 streets.

Geography 
Voyvyl is located 17 km south of Kosa (the district's administrative centre) by road. Puksib is the nearest rural locality.

References 

Rural localities in Kosinsky District